Pavel Wonka (January 21, 1953 in Vrchlabí – April 24, 1988 in Hradec Králové) was a Czechoslovak liberal political activist, dissident, human rights activist, anti-communist, and the last political prisoner to die in a communist prison in the Czechoslovak Socialist Republic. 

He was born to a family of mixed Czech and German origin; a liberal supporter of parliamentary democracy, he became involved in the resistance against the communist regime of Czechoslovakia. As a result he was arrested for his liberal views, brutally beaten, starved, tortured and interrogated by the communist secret police. He was initially released because of bad health, but the judge, Marcela Horváthová, sent him back to prison for another five months. There he died due to a lack of medical care. He was the last Czechoslovak political prisoner who died while imprisoned; after the fall of communism the persecution of Wonka was deemed a human rights violation by the regime.

On 28 October 2013, he was posthumously awarded the Medal of Merit.

External links
 Pavel WONKA: TOTALITA

References 

Czechoslovak people who died in prison custody
1951 births
1988 deaths
People from Vrchlabí
Recipients of Medal of Merit (Czech Republic)
Czech anti-communists
Czechoslovak dissidents